Jank may refer to:

Jank (band), American rock band
Jank (surname), a German surname
Jank Zajfman, or Yank Azman (born 1947), Canadian actor
 Jank (web), website sub 60 frames per second (fps) responsiveness